Elaphidion williamsi is a species of beetle in the family Cerambycidae. It was described by Chemsak in 1967.

References

williamsi
Beetles described in 1967